Jerome Steinert (November 6, 1883 – October 6, 1966) was an American cyclist. He competed in two events at the 1912 Summer Olympics.

References

External links
 

1883 births
1966 deaths
American male cyclists
Olympic cyclists of the United States
Cyclists at the 1912 Summer Olympics
Cyclists from New York (state)
People from Hicksville, New York